Fuckfest may refer to:

a sexual slang term for multiple sexual intercourse, especially group sex
Fuckfest (album), a 1989 album by Oxbow
"Fuckfest", a song on the 2000 Big Ed album Special Forces
"FuckFest", a song on the 2007 Dreddup album Future Porn Machine

See also